Lucas Cwmbran is a Welsh football team based in Cwmbran.  The team currently play in the Gwent County League Premier Division, which is at the fourth tier of the Welsh football league system.

History
The club was formed as part of two factory teams, Cwmbran Girlings FC and Pontypool Girlings FC. These two sides combined in the 1990s to become a stronger team competing as Girlings FC.  In the 2000s Saunders Valve FC amalgamated with the club to create the present club of Lucas Cwmbran AFC.

They were founding members of the Gwent County League.

Honours
Gwent County League Division One - Runners-up: 2019-20
Gwent County League Division Three -  Runners-up: 2010-11

External links
Official club website
Official club twitter

References

Football clubs in Wales
Works association football teams in Wales
Gwent County League clubs
Cwmbran